This article presents a list of the historical events and publications of Australian literature during 1972.

Major publications

Books 
 Thea Astley – The Acolyte
 Russell Braddon – End Play
 Jon Cleary – Man's Estate
 Sumner Locke Elliott – The Man Who Got Away
 Catherine Gaskin – A Falcon for a Queen
 David Ireland – The Flesheaters
 Thomas Keneally – The Chant of Jimmie Blacksmith
 Peter Mathers – The Wort Papers

Short stories 
 Peter Carey
 "Crabs"
 "Peeling"
 Frank Hardy – It's Moments Like These
 Elizabeth Jolley – "Dingle the Fool"
 Frank Moorhouse – The Americans, Baby
 Kath Walker – Stradbroke Dreaming

Children's and Young Adult fiction 
 Hesba Brinsmead – Echo in the Wilderness
 Alan Marshall – Fight for Life
 Mary Elwyn Patchett – Rebel Brumby
 Ivan Southall – Head in the Clouds
 Eleanor Spence – The Nothing Place
 Patricia Wrightson – An Older Kind of Magic

Science fiction and fantasy
 A. Bertram Chandler – The Hard Way Up

Poetry 

 Michael Dransfield
 Drug Poems
 The Inspector of Tides
 Harry Payne Heseltine – The Penguin Book of Australian Verse (edited)
 Les Murray – Poems Against Economics
 Peter Porter
 After Martial
 Preaching to the Converted
 Thomas Shapcott – Begin With Walking
 Peter Skrzynecki – Head-Waters

Drama 
 David Williamson – Juggler's Three

Awards and honours

Literary

Children and Young Adult

Poetry

Births 
A list, ordered by date of birth (and, if the date is either unspecified or repeated, ordered alphabetically by surname) of births in 1972 of Australian literary figures, authors of written works or literature-related individuals follows, including year of death.

Unknown date
 Louis Armand, poet and critic
 Steve Toltz, novelist
 Samuel Wagan Watson, poet
 Helen Dale (born Helen Darville), novelist

Deaths 
A list, ordered by date of death (and, if the date is either unspecified or repeated, ordered alphabetically by surname) of deaths in 1972 of Australian literary figures, authors of written works or literature-related individuals follows, including year of birth.

 3 June – Martin Boyd, novelist (born 1893)
 16 August – Dulcie Deamer, poet (born 1890)
16 October – Eunice Hanger, playwright and educator (born 1911)

See also 
 1972 in literature
 1972 in poetry
 List of years in literature
 List of years in Australian literature
1972 in literature
1971 in Australian literature
1972 in Australia
1973 in Australian literature

References

 
Australian literature by year
20th-century Australian literature
1972 in literature